Regis Kelly may refer to:
Regis B. Kelly, Scottish neuroscientist and university administrator
Regis "Pep" Kelly (1914–1990), Canadian ice hockey player

See also
Live! with Regis and Kelly, an American morning talk show